Görling is a Swedish surname. Notable people with this surname include:

 Adolph Görling (1820–1877), German journalist and author
 Felix Görling (1860-1932), German sculptor and painter
 Miff Görling (1909–1988), Swedish musician
 Nathan Görling (1905–2002), Swedish musician
 Zilas Görling (1911–1960), Swedish musician